The Stars Are Dark is a 1943 spy thriller novel by the British writer Peter Cheyney. It was published in America with the alternative title The London Spy Murders. It follows on from the 1942 novel Dark Duet focusing on British counter intelligence operations during the Second World War, and introduces the character of Quale a senior British intelligence officer would appear in several novels.

Synopsis
Quale receives information from Morocco about the German forces operating in North Africa and puts his agents into action.

References

Bibliography
 Panek, LeRoy. The Special Branch: The British Spy Novel, 1890-1980. Popular Press, 1981.
 Reilly, John M. Twentieth Century Crime & Mystery Writers. Springer, 2015.

1943 British novels
Novels by Peter Cheyney
British thriller novels
British spy novels
Novels set in London
William Collins, Sons books
Novels set during World War II